Soneswar is a village in Kamrup rural district, situated near north bank of river Brahmaputra.

Transport
The village is located near of National Highway 31.

See also
 Amingaon
 Guwakuchi

References

Villages in Kamrup district